Tony Rivers (born Douglas Anthony Thompson, 21 December 1940, Shildon, County Durham, England) is an English singer, best known for singing with the groups Tony Rivers and the Castaways and Harmony Grass. Additionally, Rivers sang on albums by Steve Harley & Cockney Rebel, Roger Daltrey, Shakin' Stevens and Cliff Richard.

Rivers went to Raine's Foundation School in Bethnal Green. After working at Butlins' Holiday Camp in Clacton, he joined a group called 'The Cutaways' and they became 'Tony Rivers and the Castaways'. They recorded six singles for EMI between 1963 and 1966, but did not have a hit. In 1968 the band disbanded and Rivers formed Harmony Grass with former band mates. Their single "Move in a Little Closer" reached No. 24 on the UK Singles Chart in January 1969. They released one album, This Is Us, on RCA, and gave concerts in the UK (including at London's Marquee Club). Rivers left to go solo in 1970.

Rivers started to do session work and performed many cover versions on the Top of the Pops records. He sang and arranged with/for Cliff Richard throughout the 1970s up to the late 1980s, going on world tours and assisting with the production of recordings for Richard during that period, including arranging the harmonies and singing backing vocals on hits such as "Miss You Nights" and "Devil Woman". Rivers also worked on recordings and hits for musicians as diverse as Steve Harley, Shakin' Stevens, Sheena Easton, Soft Machine, UFO, Pink Floyd (The Final Cut), The Who and others. He is the voice of West Ham United F.C. for their hit version of "I'm Forever Blowing Bubbles" and the voice leading the Whatever Happened to the Likely Lads? theme.

Rivers sang on the 2005 Saint Etienne album, Tales from Turnpike House, performing harmonies with his son Anthony Rivers. His autobiography, I'm Nearly Famous (The Tales of a Likely Lad) was published in 2019.

References

External links

1940 births
Living people
English male singers
English songwriters
English pop singers
People from Shildon
English session musicians
People educated at Raine's Foundation School
British male songwriters